Nikos Moustakis (born 4 May 1990) is a Greek professional footballer who plays as a right-back for Panelefsiniakos.

References

1990 births
Living people
Super League Greece 2 players
Football League (Greece) players
Gamma Ethniki players
A.O. Nea Ionia F.C. players
Vyzas F.C. players
A.O. Glyfada players
Fokikos A.C. players
OFI Crete F.C. players
Acharnaikos F.C. players
Panelefsiniakos F.C. players
Aittitos Spata F.C. players
Ionikos F.C. players
Association football fullbacks
Footballers from Athens
Greek footballers